Félix Castello or Castelo (4 July 1595 – 12 September 1651) was a Spanish painter of the Baroque period.

Early life

He was born and died in Madrid. His father, Fabrizio Castello, was a painter for King Philip II of Spain in El Escorial, the palace of Alba de Tormes, and the Palacio de Pardo. His mother died in childbirth in 1608. Felix's grandfather was the painter Giovanni Battista Castello (known as  Il Bergamasco). He later trained with Vincenzo Carducci and Bartolomeo Carducci. In December 1615 he married Catherine de Argüello. Two years later he received the title of Painter to the King which was made vacant on the death of his father,

Career
Castello's style was very similar to the Carducci's, and therefore there have been challenges in identifying attributions. It seems likely he remained several years working as an officer in Carducci's workshop, because until 1633 there is no documentation of his work as an independent painter. In 1627 he was called for the second time as Painter to the King position, left vacant now after Bartolomé González y Serrano's death.

Castello painted for the chapel of Santo Cristo de la Paciencia in the Convent of the Capuchins. He also painted for the cloister of the Convent of Santa Barbara. He is also said to have contributed along with Alonzo Cano and others to the portraits of kings for the Royal Palace of Madrid.  He also worked on the Lactation of the Virgin to St. Bernard, in the church of San Juan in Telde ( Gran Canaria ), and some works attributed by stylistic similarity, among which the Saint Francis of Assisi at the Prado Museum.

Later life
The next documented event in his life comes November 1647, when he is widowed, and then remarried soon after to Barbara Huete (February 1648). He died in Madrid on September 12, 1651.

References
Antonio Palomino, An account of the lives and works of the most eminent Spanish painters, sculptors and architects, 1724, first English translation, 1739, p. 41

 Angulo Iñiguez, Diego, and Pérez Sánchez, Alfonso E. Painting Madrid the first third of the seventeenth century, 1969, Madrid: Diego Velazquez Institute, CSIC,
 Pérez Sánchez, Alfonso E. (1992). Baroque Painting in Spain 1600-1750. Madrid: Ediciones Chair. .
 Corpus Velazquez. Documents and Texts, volume I, Madrid, 2000, Ministry of Education, p. 66. 

1595 births
1656 deaths
17th-century Spanish painters
Spanish male painters
Artists from Madrid
Spanish Baroque painters